Addam Yekutieli a.k.a. Know Hope (1986) is a contemporary artist whose work consists of social practice projects, immersive installations, and public artworks. He first became known for his work in the streets of Tel Aviv under the pseudonym Know Hope. He is best known as one of the first Israeli street artists to gain international recognition. 

Yekutieli facilitates community and long-term projects that deal with ideas of re-contextualization and dialogue through public space. His work revolves around cross cultural encounters, examining issues such as borders, collective memory, and the nexus between the personal and the political. 

Yekutieli is a prominent figure in Israeli street-art culture. He also exhibits in galleries and museums internationally using ready-made materials, mixed media pieces, photographs, videos and text. According to Complex, Yekutieli is considered one of the world's leading contemporary street artists. Though a visual artist, text is a prominent element in Yekutieli's work, known for its "poetry and lyricism." His work revolves around the human condition and around finding "unity in a fragmented world."

Early life 
Yekutieli grew up in a mixed heritage home, with roots in Japan, USA, and Israel. In his teens, he found inspiration in punk subculture and skateboarding. This heavily influenced the aesthetics in his early work. In his late teens he began creating art in streets of Tel Aviv. Although his art was categorized as street art, Yekutieli did not use traditional aerosol spray paint, but rather acrylic paint, markers, paper and cardboard. Many of his early works were of the ephemeral nature, not intended to remain on the street permanently, Yekutieli intentionally using materials such as wheatpaste, installations, found materials, etc.

Know Hope 
Shortly after beginning to work on the street, Yekutieli began writing the phrase “Know Hope” on walls around the city. Due to its obvious word-play and the difference between reading the text and hearing it possibly as 'no hope,' the phrase was referring to the chasm between hope and despair.  Yekutieli enjoyed the ambiguity of the phrase and the subjective perception on behalf of the viewers. The dualism and symbiosis between the multiple meanings of the phrase would continue to inform Yekutieli's work later on. Yekutieli "never intended on [it] becoming an artist name." It was only after being referred to as Know Hope by a local newspaper that Yekutieli understood that the public referred to the creator of the art as such.

Early work 

Yekutieli started exhibiting his work in the streets of Tel Aviv in early 2005. His pseudonym Know Hope began appearing next to his most common long-arms and long-legged unisex character. A couple of years after the INSIDE JOB, a street-art group show in the Helena Rubenstein Pavilion for Contemporary Art, Yekutieli began exhibiting in early 2013 in one of Israel's most prominent galleries Gordon Gallery. That same year, Yekutieli also started working with Steve Lazarides and his London-based gallery Lazarides Rathbone. In 2014 Yekutieli took part in a group exhibit in the Roskilde Museum of Contemporary Art. In 2014, parallel to his iconography work that by now has developed to include a repetitive use of white-flags, birds, wood, and fences, Yekutieli began working on long term ongoing projects.

Truth and Method (2014–present) 

In late 2014 Yekutieli sent out an open call for participants in Tel Aviv and NYC to take part in his art and allow him to tattoo them. Yekutieli's websites describes the project as:

"Truth and Method is firmly based on real human situations, continuing a process of extensive observations of context and appropriation whilst providing greater insight into a reflective practice.Images of site-specific street pieces form the basis of the exhibition, with a series of poignant, text-based messages creating open-ended narratives reinforced by their context. This initial starting point allows each urban environment to take an active part in the dialogue and determine how the audience may perceive them.Following this, the same texts are tattooed on volunteer participants, extending the work away from the ethereal nature of outdoor work and instead taking on a more permanent quality. By translating the initial text-based artwork onto active participants the work manifests itself in a new shape with a far more intimate meaning."

The Truth and Method project was first exhibited in the Tel Aviv Gordon Gallery. Later on in 2015 Yekutieli exhibited another section of the project, in which he tattooed about 50 participants, in the NYC-based gallery Catinca Tabacaru.

Taking Sides (2015–present) 

During a residency in Cologne (Germany) Yekutieli began a series of public interventions in which a white thin line is drawn in the street to create s supposed border. On both sides of the line opposing sentences are written to enhance the idea of space as difference and otherness.

"Creating juxtapositions between the personal and the political, Taking Sides is an observation on how sometimes sides are chosen and larger ideologies and allegiances are adopted- at times consciously, but most commonly in a hereditary and automatic way, or in a manner dictated by circumstance."

During 2016 Yekutieli undertook another series of interventions this time in the city of Lyon for a group exhibit in the Musée d'art contemporain de Lyon. This time adding video-art as another medium in this project, Yekutieli juxtaposed videos documenting intervention in public space around the city of Lyon with videos that exhibit notions of territory and borders such as the Israeli Separation Wall, the Lesvos Shoreline, and the Calais Eurotunnel.

Vicariously Speaking (2016–present) 

In 2016 working with OZ Arts in Nashville (U.S.A) for a community-based project, Addam began corresponding with prisoner who are currently on death row in a Nashville prison. Yekutieli describes the project in his website: "Following this correspondence, fragments of sentences from the inmates’ letters were extracted and placed on a series of billboards around the city.By taking these phrases out of their original context and placing them in a new one, a newfound presence for the inmates takes place in public space and a dialogue within an interactive environment is created between two separate realities.This dynamic process allows a reflection on notions such as ones origin and permits an intuitive and empathetic understanding of a commonly complex issue."This project was shown in OZ Arts during 2016 but did not yet receive a comprehensive gallery day-view due to its ongoing nature that requires a longer period of correspondence and documentation.

Exhibitions

Selected solo exhibitions
2007: Just Because You Are Listening, The New and Bad Gallery, Tel-Aviv, Israel
2008: Temporary Residence, Anno Domini Gallery, San Jose, CA
2009: How We Got There//Like Pigeons in the Rain, X-Initiative, New York City
2009: The Times Won’t Save You (This Rain Smells of Memory), Carmichael Gallery, Los Angeles, CA
2009: Through These Vacant Spaces We Can See Anywhere, Rialto, Rome
2009: The Insecurities of Time, Ad Hoc Art, New York City
2010: There Is Nothing Dear (There Is Too Much Dear), Cooper Cole Gallery, Toronto, Canada
2011: Bound By The Ties, The Speak Easy, Tel Aviv, Israel (Book release event and installation)
2012: Others' Truths, zine release event and exhibition, Studio Gallery, Tel Aviv, Israel
2012: Representing Israel at Art Beijing, Beijing
2012: The Weight, Known Gallery, Los Angeles, CA
2013: The Abstract and the Very Real, Lazarides Gallery, London
2013: Things That Stand Between/ Things Left Standing Behind, two part solo exhibition Gordon Gallery 2, Tel Aviv, Israel
2014: These Traintracks, They Remain, Ungrudged by the Passing Through, Thinkspace Gallery at Scope Art Fair, New York City
2015: Empathy, Catinca Tabacaru Gallery, New York City
2015: Water Takes the Shape of Its Container, Openspace Gallery, Paris
2015: Truth and Method, Gordon Gallery, Tel Aviv, Israel
2016: These Are Maps, Gordon Gallery, Tel Aviv, Israel
2016: The Truth, As Told In Our Mother Tongue, Die Kunstagentin, Cologne, Germany
2017: It Took Me Till Now To Find You, Lazarides Gallery, London
2019: A Pathology of Hope, Gordon Gallery, Tel Aviv

Selected group exhibitions 
2011: The Underbelly Project, Pop-up show, in association with Opera Gallery New York, Miami, FL
2011: Inside Job- Street Art In Tel Aviv, Helena Rubenstein Pavilion for Contemporary Art (Tel Aviv Museum), Tel Aviv, Israel
2014: Streets of the World, Opera Gallery, New York City
2012: Winter Group Show, White Walls Gallery, San Francisco, CA
2013: Needles+Pens 10 Year Anniversary Show, The Luggage Store, San Francisco, CA
2014: Cash, Cans & Candy, HilgerNEXT Gallery, Vienna, Austria
2014: PULP, The Outsiders, Newcastle, UK
2014: Space/Squared, White Walls Gallery, San Francisco, CA
2014: Pow!Wow!: Exploring the New Contemporary Art Movement, Honolulu Museum of Art School, Honolulu, Hawaii, USA
2014: Black Milk- Holocaust in Contemporary Art, Museum of Contemporary Art in Roskilde, Denmark
2015: Invisible College, Fort Wayne Museum of Art in association with Thinkspace Gallery, Fort Wayne, Indiana, USA
2015: La Familia, Thinkspace Gallery, Culver City, CA
2016: WordsWordsWords, Spring Break Art Fair
2016: Still Here, Lazarides Gallery, London
2016: Jameco Exchange, in association with No Longer Empty
2016: Wall Drawings – Urban Icons, Musée d'art contemporain de Lyon, Lyon, France

References

External links

A video interview by BBC Fresh
Interview with Uproxx

Israeli contemporary artists
Living people
Pseudonymous artists
1986 births